Puteaux is a railway station in the town Puteaux, Hauts-de-Seine department, in the western suburbs of Paris, France.

The station originally opened on 18 July 1840, as part of the Paris to St Cloud and Versailles railway.

External links

 

Railway stations in Hauts-de-Seine
Railway stations in France opened in 1840